Connecticut's 98th House of Representatives district elects one member of the Connecticut House of Representatives. It encompasses parts of Branford and Guilford and has been represented by Democrat Sean Scanlon since 2015.

Recent elections

2020

2018

2016

2014

2012

References

98